All the Kings Horses is a 1935 American comedy musical film adapted from the 1934 Broadway musical of the same name by Frederick Herendeen (musical book and lyricist) and Edward A. Horan (music composer) which was in turn based on the play Carlo Rocco by Lawrence Clarke and Max Giersberg. The film was directed by Frank Tuttle and starring Carl Brisson and Mary Ellis. The film tells the story of a film actor who changes places with a Ruritanian prince. The screenplay is based on a play by Lawrence Clark, Max Giersberg, Frederik Herendeen and Edward Horan.

The film was nominated by the Academy of Motion Picture Arts and Sciences for Best Dance Direction.

Cast
 Carl Brisson as King Rudolf XIV/Carlo Rocco
 Mary Ellis as Elaine, Queen of Langenstein
 Edward Everett Horton as Count Josef von Schlapstaat
 Katherine DeMille as Miss Mimi
 Eugene Pallette as Con Conley
 Arnold Korff as Baron Kraemer

References

In Hungary, the film was banned by the National Motion Picture Examination Committee (distribution, presentation - July 25, 1935).
A magyarországon a filmet az Országos Mozgóképvizsgáló Bizottság betiltotta (forgalmazását, terjesztését, bemutatását - 1935. július 25.).
https://adtplus.arcanum.hu/hu/view/AzEst_1935_07/

Bibliography
 Eames, John Douglas, The Paramount Story, London: Octopus Books, 1985
 Maltin, Leonard, Classic Movie Guide, New York: Plume, 2010

External links
 

1935 films
American black-and-white films
1930s English-language films
Paramount Pictures films
1935 musical comedy films
American musical comedy films
American films based on plays
1930s American films